Tolivirales is an order of RNA viruses which infect insects and plants. Member viruses have a positive-sense single-stranded RNA genome. The virions are non-enveloped, spherical, and have an icosahedral capsid. The name of the group is a syllabic abbreviation of "tombusvirus-like" with the suffix -virales indicating a virus order.

Taxonomy
The following families are recognized:
Carmotetraviridae
Tombusviridae

References

Viruses